The 1974 Maryland Terrapins football team represented University of Maryland in the 1974 NCAA Division I football season. The Terrapins offense scored 316 points while the defense allowed 104 points. Led by head coach Jerry Claiborne, the Terrapins appeared in the Liberty Bowl.

Schedule

Roster

1975 NFL Draft
The following players were selected in the 1975 NFL Draft.

Awards and honors
 Randy White: Lombardi Award, Outland Trophy

References

Maryland
Maryland Terrapins football seasons
Atlantic Coast Conference football champion seasons
Maryland Terrapins football